Luče moje is the eighteenth studio album by Serbian singer Dragana Mirković. It was released in 2006.

Track listing
Ako me ostaviš (If you leave me)
Pečat na usnama (Stamp on you lips)
Na kraju (At the end)
Sudbina (Destiny)
Luče moje (My sweetheart)
Luda kao ja (Crazy like me)
Ljubi il' ubi (Kiss or kill)
Danak ljubavi (Tribute of love)
Hoću sve (I want everything)
Teci mi kroz vene (Run through my veins)
Depresivan dan (Depressing day)
Nepoželjna (Undesirable)

References

2006 albums
Dragana Mirković albums